The John Embert Farm is a historic home located at Millington, Queen Anne's County, Maryland, United States. It is a -story Flemish bond brick house with a two-bay facade. The building is an exceedingly rare and almost pristine example of a small-scale Tidewater house.

The John Embert Farm was listed on the National Register of Historic Places in 1980.

References

External links
, including photo from 1978, at Maryland Historical Trust

Houses on the National Register of Historic Places in Maryland
Houses in Queen Anne's County, Maryland
National Register of Historic Places in Queen Anne's County, Maryland
1800 establishments in Maryland
Houses completed in 1800